, a pseudo-Latin term, may refer to:

 Common Era, the current world-wide calendar
 Era Vulgaris (album), an album by American group Queens Of The Stone Age

See also
Aleister Crowley (1875–1947), English occultist who coined the phrase